Sarah Roberts (born December 9, 1974) is an American politician from the state of Michigan.  Since 2009, she has served in the Michigan State House of Representatives. A Democrat, Roberts represents the 24th State House District, which is located in eastern Macomb County and includes the city of St. Clair Shores and Harrison Township, as well as the small portion of Grosse Pointe Shores that is located within Macomb County.  Prior to being elected in 2008, Roberts represented Northern St. Clair Shores in the Macomb County Commission.

Biography
Sarah Roberts was born on December 9, 1974 in Michigan to Helen and Charles Roberts.  She graduated from the University of Iowa, receiving her bachelor's degree in 2000.  She served as a community organizer for Clean Water Action of Macomb County from 2003-2005. She worked in the Communications Department of the House Democratic Caucus in the Michigan State House of Representatives from 2005-2006 before being elected to the Macomb County Board of Commissioners.

Political career
In 2006, Sarah Roberts announced her campaign for the Macomb County Commission.  She ran for the 24th District, located in Northern St. Clair Shores.  The 24th was being vacated by Democrat Peggy A. Kennard and leans Democratic.  Roberts defeated Republican Richard A. Doan by a large margin.  She served on the Commission for two years before being elected to the State House of Representatives.

In January 2008, Roberts filed to run as a Democrat for the 24th State House District, which was being vacated by Republican Jack Brandenburg, who was barred from running for re-election due to term limits.  She faced seven other Democrats in the primary election, but still carried 63% of the vote.  The 24th District is a narrow district that runs North-to-South along Lake St. Clair. It includes the city of St. Clair Shores, Harrison Township, and a small portion of Grosse Pointe Shores, and is normally a battleground district, although it historically favored Democrats (prior to Jack Brandenburg, the seat had been held by a Democrat going back to the 1970s).  In the general election, Roberts faced Republican Bryan Brandenburg, an unsuccessful candidate for Macomb County Commission and son of then-current Representative Jack Brandenburg.

The race for the 24th District was one of the most competitive in Michigan.  The State Democratic party alone invested over $220,000 in the race, an extraordinary number for a State House race.  The race featured a large amount of negative campaigning, including adds that raised questions about four incidents involving Brandenburg in which the police investigated but no charges were filed, including an assault accusation at a party. On election day, Roberts emerged narrowly victorious by just over 1,000 votes, or about 2%.  President Obama carried the 24th District by a similarly narrow 51.5%-46.4% margin.

Sarah Roberts took office on January 1, 2009. She sits on the Education, Energy and Technology, Great Lakes and Environment, and Military, Vet. Affairs, and Homeland Security Committees.

Electoral history
2008 campaign for State House
Sarah Roberts (D), 49.4%
Bryan Brandenburg (R), 47.1%
2006 campaign for Macomb County Commission
Sarah Roberts (D), 59.2%
Richard A. Doan (R), 39.2%

References

External links
 House Democrats Website
 Detroit News Biography

1974 births
Living people
Democratic Party members of the Michigan House of Representatives
Women state legislators in Michigan
University of Iowa alumni
People from St. Clair Shores, Michigan
21st-century American politicians
21st-century American women politicians